Wethersfield Stone Schoolhouse is a historic one room school building located at Trenton in Oneida County, New York. It was built about 1825 and is a vernacular one story, rectangular, gable roofed, stone masonry structure, .  It functioned as a public school until 1934.

It was listed on the National Register of Historic Places in 2005.

References

One-room schoolhouses in New York (state)
Schoolhouses in the United States
School buildings on the National Register of Historic Places in New York (state)
School buildings completed in 1825
Buildings and structures in Oneida County, New York
Stone school buildings
National Register of Historic Places in Oneida County, New York
Stone buildings in the United States